Coniston Water in the English county of Cumbria is the third-largest lake in the Lake District by volume (after Windermere and Ullswater), and the fifth-largest by area. The lake has an elevation of 143 feet (44 m) above sea level. It drains to the sea via the River Crake.

Geography and administration
Coniston Water is situated within Furness, part of the North Lonsdale exclave of the historic county of Lancashire. Since 1974, it is within the administrative county of Cumbria.

Coniston Water is an example of a ribbon lake formed by glaciation. The lake sits in a deep U-shaped glaciated valley scoured by a glacier in the surrounding volcanic and limestone rocks during the last ice age.

To the north-west of the lake rises the Old Man of Coniston, the highest fell in the Coniston Fells group and the highest point in the historic county of Lancashire.

Etymology
" 'The king's estate or village'. The second el.[ement] is OE tūn, and the whole name may, like numerous English Kingstons, be from OE 'cyninges-tūn'. ... Scand[inavian] influence is, meanwhile, shown by the '-o-' of early and modern spellings, and Ekwall speculated that this could have been the centre of a 'small Scandinavian mountain kingdom' ".
Plus "OE 'wæter', with the meaning probably influenced by its ON relative 'vatn'."
(OE=Old English; ON=Old Norse).

History
Remains of agricultural settlements from the Bronze Age have been found near the shores of Coniston Water. The Romans mined copper from the fells above the lake. A potash kiln and two iron bloomeries show that industrial activity continued in medieval times. In the 13th and 14th centuries, Coniston Water was an important source of fish for the monks of Furness Abbey who owned the lake and much of the surrounding land. Copper mining continued in the area until the 19th century.

The lake was formerly known as "Thurston Water", a name derived from the Old Norse personal name 'Thursteinn' + Old English 'waeter'. This name was used as an alternative to Coniston Water until the late 18th century.

The Victorian artist and philosopher John Ruskin owned Brantwood House on the eastern shore of the lake, and lived in it from 1872 until his death in 1900. Ruskin is buried in the churchyard in the village of Coniston, at the northern end of the lake. His secretary the antiquarian W. G. Collingwood wrote a historical novel Thorstein of the Mere about the Northmen who settled on the island in the lake.

The Victorian and Edwardian artist Henry Robinson Hall settled in Coniston during the Great War and is buried in the parish church graveyard.

Arthur Ransome set his children's novel Swallows and Amazons and the sequels Swallowdale, Winter Holiday, Pigeon Post and The Picts and the Martyrs around a fictional lake derived from a combination of Coniston Water and Windermere. The fictional lake resembles Windermere, but the surrounding hills and fells resemble those of Coniston Water. Some of Coniston Water's islands and other local landmarks can be identified in the novels. In particular the books' Wild Cat Island with its secret harbour is based on Peel Island. The Amazon River is based on the River Crake. The Swallows and Amazons series involve school holiday adventures in the 1930s. The movie adaptation (2016) of these stories was also partly filmed on Peel Island, Coniston Water. 

Historically, Coniston was part of Lancashire (North of the Sands), until Local Government reorganisation in 1974 when Cumbria was created.

Waterspeed record 

In the 20th century Coniston Water was the scene of many attempts to break the world water speed record. On 19 August 1939 Sir Malcolm Campbell set the record at 141.74 miles per hour in Blue Bird K4. Between 1956 and 1959 Sir Malcolm's son Donald Campbell set four successive records on the lake in Bluebird K7, a hydroplane; in 1967 he was killed just after achieving a speed of over 320 miles per hour in Bluebird K7 in a record-breaking attempt.

Lady in the Lake 
In recent times, Coniston Water has become known for a controversial murder case. Mrs Carol Park was dubbed the "Lady in the Lake" after the Raymond Chandler novel of the same name.

Boating 

The lake is ideal for kayaking and canoeing and there are a number of good sites for launching and recovery. It is paddled as the second leg of the Three Lakes Challenge.
The steam yacht Gondola tours the lake in the summer months, along with two smaller motorised launches.

Boats can be hired from the lakeside near the steam yacht, with various sizes of boat for hire, from small canoes and kayaks to large personal craft. This is suspended temporarily for boats attempting new world waterspeed records during Records Week, usually the first week in November.

In Art and Literature 

Letitia Elizabeth Landon's escapist poem "Coniston Water" illustrates an engraving of a painting entitled Coniston Water from Nebthwaite, Lancashire by Thomas Allom.

Gallery

References

External links

Tourist attractions in Coniston
Gondola information
Lake District Walks – Coniston Water

Water speed records
Lakes of the Lake District
Coniston, Cumbria
LConiston